John William Carter (born 23 June 1935) is a former English cricketer. Carter was a right-handed batsman. He was born at Oxford, Oxfordshire.

Carter made his debut for Oxfordshire against Berkshire in the 1953 Minor Counties Championship. He played minor counties cricket for Oxfordshire on 35 occasions to 1957. He joined Leicestershire in 1959, making his first-class debut for the county against Oxford University, with him making six further first-class appearances for the county in that season, with his final appearance coming against Surrey. In his seven first-class matches for Leicestershire, he scored a total of 209 runs at an average of 14.92, with a high score of 41. He later returned to playing minor counties cricket for Oxfordshire, making five appearances for the county in 1961.

References

External links
John Carter at ESPNcricinfo
John Carter at CricketArchive

1935 births
Living people
Cricketers from Oxford
English cricketers
Oxfordshire cricketers
Leicestershire cricketers